Gorgonia flabellum, also known as the Venus fan, Venus sea fan, West Indian sea fan, and purple gorgonian seafan, is a species of sea fan, a sessile colonial soft coral.

Description 
The Venus sea fan is a delicate-looking colonial soft coral in the form of a fan composed of a lattice of branches in a single plane. The coral grows from a small base, forming several main branches with side branches and a network of small branchlets. The Venus sea fan is similar in appearance to Gorgonia ventalina, but has a slightly more untidy shape and short, stubby side growths coming out of the main plane. In G. flabellum, the branches are flattened at right angles to the plane of the fan, while in G. ventalina, the branches are either round or flattened parallel to the plane of the fan. The wide-mesh sea fan (Gorgonia mariae) is also similar in appearance, but at only 30 cm, is smaller, and many of the branchlets do not interconnect. The Venus sea fan is white, yellowish, or pale lavender.

Distribution and habitat 
The Venus sea fan is very common in the Bahamas, and in this location is easily distinguishable from G. ventalina. In other parts of its range, Florida and the Lesser Antilles, however, the two species are more easily confused.

Biology 
The skeleton of the Venus sea fan is composed of calcite and a collagen-like substance. Embedded in this are the coral polyps, each of which is a filter feeder and extends its eight tentacles to catch plankton drifting past with the current. The tissues contain symbiotic dinoflagellate algae Symbiodinium spp. which are photosynthetic and use sunlight to create organic carbon compounds which are then available to the host coral.

References 

Gorgoniidae
Corals described in 1758
Taxa named by Carl Linnaeus